The following lists events that happened in 2004 in Iceland.

Incumbents
President – Ólafur Ragnar Grímsson 
Prime Minister – Davíð Oddsson (until 29 September), Halldór Ásgrímsson (starting 29 September)

Events

June
 June 26 - A presidential election was held with Ólafur Ragnar Grímsson winning making him President of Iceland.

September
 September 15 - The cabinet of Halldór Ásgrímsson is formed.

 
2000s in Iceland
Iceland
Iceland
Years of the 21st century in Iceland